Jamison Jones (born February 15, 1969) is an American actor, known for his leading roles in the films He Was a Quiet Man and The Wretched, and as a regular cast member on General Hospital, and in the Fox series 24. He originated the title role in the world premiere of Roberto Aguirre-Sacasa’s Doctor Cerberus at the Tony Award-winning South Coast Repertory. Jones has also guest-starred on several television series, including Burn Notice, Will & Grace, CSI: NY, NCIS, True Detective and The Whispers.

Early life
Born in Rochester, Michigan, Jones spent several years living abroad. He attended Frankfurt International School in Germany before returning to Michigan for his high school years where he began taking up acting. He graduated from Rochester Adams High School in 1987. After being accepted with a scholarship to the WMU Theater department, Jones spent 2 years at Western Michigan University before moving to Los Angeles where he studied theatre in University of California, Los Angeles. He finished his Bachelor's degree at California State University, Fullerton.

Career
Jones began his professional career on stage in the European Premieres of Purple Hearts and Tennessee in the Summer at the Edinburgh Festival in Scotland. Jones is a graduate of the MFA Advanced Training Program at the American Conservatory Theater. After graduation, Jones became a member of ACT’s professional acting company and worked on the critically acclaimed Angels in America directed by Mark Wing-Davey also starring Ben Shenkman, Rosencrantz and Guildenstern are Dead and Othello. Jones returned to ACT in 2012 to perform in the west coast premiere of Jordan Harrison's Maple and Vine and played the titular role in Ensemble Theater's visually compelling cutting edge production of Macbeth.

Jones' first film roles were in Lucasfilm's Radioland Murders (1994) and in the LucasArts video game Star Wars: Rebel Assault II (1995). In 1996, Jones moved to Los Angeles to continue his career in film and television. Film credits include The Lodger with Alfred Molina; Born to Ride (2010) with William Forsythe; He Was a Quiet Man (2007) with Christian Slater and William H. Macy; Dark Blue (2002) with Kurt Russell; Hollywood Homicide (2003) with Harrison Ford. He has both an actor and producer credits for West of Brooklyn (2008) with Joe Mantegna. Jones taught acting at the American Musical and Dramatic Academy but continues to teach privately in Hollywood at Television Center Studios.

Jones has also served as Theater Director, Screenwriter and Producer and is a part-owner of a bi-coastal film development company named Jones Films Entertainment. Jones Films is developing several feature films and television projects, including Agoura Hills, the story of an agoraphobic weatherman who is afraid to go outside; and Malibu Gothic, which follows the life of an aging international movie star who falls into the unenviable position of protecting Malibu's secret society from the rest of the world.

Filmography

Film

Television

Theater

References

External links

 

American male film actors
American male television actors
Male actors from Michigan
Film producers from Michigan
People from Rochester, Michigan
Pepperdine University faculty
Living people
1969 births